A peerage is a legal system historically comprising various hereditary titles (and sometimes non-hereditary titles) in a number of countries, and composed of assorted noble ranks.

Peerages include:

Australia
 Australian peers

Belgium
 Belgian nobility

Canada
 British peerage titles granted to Canadian subjects of the Crown
 Canadian nobility in the aristocracy of France

China
 Chinese nobility

France
 Peerage of France
 List of French peerages
 Peerage of Jerusalem

Japan
 Peerage of the Empire of Japan
 House of Peers (Japan)

Portugal
 Chamber of Most Worthy Peers

Spain

 Chamber of Peers (Spain)
 List of dukes in the peerage of Spain
 List of viscounts in the peerage of Spain
 List of barons in the peerage of Spain
 List of lords in the peerage of Spain

United Kingdom

Great Britain and Ireland 
 Peerages in the United Kingdom
Hereditary peer, holders of titles which can be inherited by an heir
 Life peer, members of the peerage of the United Kingdom whose titles cannot be inherited
 Peerage of England, holders of English titles created before 1707
 Peerage of Great Britain, holders of titles created in the Kingdom of Great Britain between 1707 and 1800
 Peerage of Ireland, holders of Irish titles created by the Crown before 1920, until 1801 carrying a seat in the Irish House of Lords, some of whom later sat in the House of Lords at Westminster
 Peerage of Scotland, holders of Scottish titles created before 1707, some of whom later sat in the House of Lords, all of them having a seat there from 1964 to 1999
Peerage of the United Kingdom, holders of most titles created since 1801 in the United Kingdom of Great Britain and Ireland (renamed United Kingdom of Great Britain and Northern Ireland after 1921)
Representative peers, holders of Scottish and Irish peerages who represented their peer-groups in the House of Lords at Westminster
Welsh peers and baronets, holders of various titles with a Welsh territorial connection
 List of dukedoms in the peerages of Britain and Ireland
 Jacobite Peerage, titles created following the deposition of King James II and VII from the thrones of England, Ireland, and Scotland

Lists of peers
Dukes: see List of dukes in the peerages of Britain and Ireland
Marquesses: see List of marquesses in the peerages of Britain and Ireland
Earls: see List of earls in the peerages of Britain and Ireland
Viscounts: see List of viscounts in the peerages of Britain and Ireland
Barons: see List of barons in the peerages of Britain and Ireland
Female peerages: see List of peerages created for women and List of peerages inherited by women

See also

 Baronage
 Pairie, French equivalent of the English word "peerage"

 
Broad-concept articles
Nobility